Harlan Hall is a historic opera house located at 603 Locust St. in Marshall, Illinois. The opera house opened in 1872 to provide a venue for theatrical performances in Marshall. The building has an Italianate design with tall, narrow windows, wide bracketed eaves, and a steeply sloping roof. Both local and traveling theatrical acts performed in the theater, which also hosted concerts, public meetings, and other events. The opera house had a livery stable on its first floor for its patrons' horses, an unusual feature for contemporary theaters. In 1904, B. F. Johnson purchased the building and converted it to a movie theater; while it still served as a civic auditorium, the building no longer showed theatrical performances after this point. The building has since held a Moose Lodge, and its first floor has been converted to a commercial space.

The building was added to the National Register of Historic Places on November 29, 2001.

References

Theatres on the National Register of Historic Places in Illinois
Italianate architecture in Illinois
Buildings and structures in Clark County, Illinois
Theatres completed in 1872
National Register of Historic Places in Clark County, Illinois